Donald Richard Graham (3 May 1922 – 3 December 1953) was an Australian rugby league player who played in the 1940s and 1950s.

Career
Originally from Tamworth, New South Wales and after being discharged from the Army, Graham began his Sydney league career in 1946. He played two seasons for St. George between 1946-1947 (including the 1946 Grand Final), moving to England he played for Hunslet and Featherstone Rovers (Heritage № 312), moving back to Australia he played for Parramatta for three seasons between 1950-1952. 
.

Death
Graham died in Blakehurst, New South Wales on 3 December 1953 from cancer, aged 31.

References

1922 births
1953 deaths
Australian Army personnel of World War II
Australian rugby league players
Featherstone Rovers players
Hunslet F.C. (1883) players
Parramatta Eels players
St. George Dragons players

Rugby league five-eighths
Rugby league players from New South Wales
Deaths from cancer in New South Wales
Australian Army soldiers